Luca Martin (born 25 November 1973 in Padova) is a former Italian rugby union player and a current coach. He played as a centre and as a fullback.

Career
Martin first played at his home team of Petrarca Padova Rugby, being promoted to the first category in 1991/92. He would play there until 1997/98. He then moved to the French team Union Bordeaux Bègles, where he would be from 1998/99 to 1999/2000. He moved once more to Northampton Saints in England, where he would play for two seasons, from 2000/01 to 2001/02, winning the Cup of England in 2001/02. After a brief stint at Bedford Bulls, he returned to Italy to represent Rugby Rovigo (2002/03-2005/06). Martin then returned to a two-season spell at Petrarca Padova Rugby (2006/07-2007/08), finishing his career at Rocia Rugby, in 2008/09, aged 35 years old, as player-coach.

He then started a coach career, being in charge of the Rocia Rugby U-19 team in 2008/09, and being nominated Head Coach of the Italy Sevens National Team in 2009.

Martin had 38 caps for Italy, from 1997 to 2002, scoring 9 tries, 45 points in aggregate. He was selected for the 1999 Rugby World Cup, playing one game. He played 3 times at the Six Nations Championship, in 2000, 2001 and 2002, scoring 2 tries, 10 points in aggregate.

External links

1973 births
Living people
Italian rugby union players
Italian rugby union coaches
Italy international rugby union players
Rugby union centres
Rugby union fullbacks
Sportspeople from Padua
Petrarca Rugby players
Italian expatriate rugby union players
Italian expatriate sportspeople in England
Expatriate rugby union players in England
Expatriate rugby union players in France
Italian expatriate sportspeople in France
Northampton Saints players
Bedford Blues players
Rugby Rovigo Delta players
CA Bordeaux-Bègles Gironde players